Optimistic Tragedy (translit. Optimisticheskaya tragediya) is a 1963 Soviet film directed by Samson Samsonov. It is based on the play An Optimistic Tragedy by Vsevolod Vishnevsky.

Plot
During Russian Revolution of 1917, the Marine squad, led by anarchist leader Vozhak  starts the revolt. The Central Committee of the Bolshevik Party sends a woman Commissar to form Red Army battalion from the marines to take part in the Russian Civil War.

Cast
 Margarita Volodina as Commissar
 Boris Andreyev as Vozhak
 Vyacheslav Tikhonov as Aleksey
 Vsevolod Sanayev as Sipliy
 Erast Garin as Vozhachok
 Vsevolod Safonov
 Oleg Strizhenov as First officer
 Gleb Strizhenov
 Valentin Belokhvostik
 Ivan Bondar

Production
The film Optimistic Tragedy is based on the 1933 play An Optimistic Tragedy by Vsevolod Vishnevsky, set during the Russian Revolution.

Samson Samsonov directed the film. 

It was shot in Sovscope 70 on black and white film stock. The prints were split into three films for exhibition in Kinopanorama 70 in some theatres.

Release
The film was entered into competition at the 1963 Cannes Film Festival.

The Kino International in East Berlin opened on 15 November 1963 with a grand opening premiere of the film.

Reception
Optimistic Tragedy was a Soviet blockbuster of 1963, with 46 million tickets sold.

The film was named Best Film of the Year and Margarita Volodina was named Best Actress of the Year by readers of the Soviet film magazine Sovetsky Ekran.

Richard Porton, in his 1999 book Film and the Anarchist Imagination, describes Optimistic Tragedy as "ingloriously didactic" and "typical of Soviet attempts to rationalize the brutal assault on the Kronstadt communards".

References

External links

1960s war drama films
1963 drama films
1963 films
Soviet war drama films
1960s Russian-language films
Russian Revolution films
Films directed by Samson Samsonov
Mosfilm films
Soviet films based on plays
Soviet epic films